Cheam High School is a mixed sex academy school located in Cheam, London Borough of Sutton, South London. It consists of a lower school, for those aged between 11 and 16, wherein each year group consists of 300 students and a sixth form for ages 17–18.

The school has specialisms in languages and the arts. The previous headteacher Miss Rebecca Allott succeeded Mr TJ Vaughan on his retirement in 2000. Mr Peter Naudi is Headteacher and the deputy head is Mr P Vosper.

Facilities 
The school has a large artificial grass pitch and smaller all-weather pitch, a fitness gym area and multiple halls, including a sports hall. The Cheam gymnastics club operates out of the school's building.

Awards
The school holds the Artsmark Gold Award from the Arts Council recognising the high quality of work in various aspects of the curriculum including art, drama, music and dance. It also has the Sportsmark Award recognising its out-of-hours sports program.

Inspections
Ofsted awarded Cheam an "Outstanding" report in 2007, 2010 and 2015. This is the highest Ofsted grade, only achieved by 20% of schools.

Notable former pupils
 Jane Wilson-Howarth, physician and author
 Seb Brown, footballer
 Koop Arponen, singer
 Jonathan Austen, also known as Jonathan I, leader of the micronation Austenasia

References

External links
Official website

Academies in the London Borough of Sutton
Secondary schools in the London Borough of Sutton

Educational institutions established in 1933
1933 establishments in England
Sutton, London